Degeh may refer to:
 Degeh, Sardasht
 Degeh, Vazineh, Sardasht County